Durham Hosiery Mills Dye House is a historic textile mill building located at Durham, Durham County, North Carolina. It was constructed by the Durham Hosiery Mills Corporation in three sections between 1920 and 1921. They are the boiler room, office / warehouse, and dyeing area. It is constructed of exterior reinforced concrete bearing walls, steel trusses and a heavy timber (“slow burn”) structural system.

It was listed on the National Register of Historic Places in 2014.

References

Textile mills in North Carolina
Industrial buildings and structures on the National Register of Historic Places in North Carolina
Industrial buildings completed in 1921
Buildings and structures in Durham, North Carolina
National Register of Historic Places in Durham County, North Carolina